The Princedom of Simsim (Chechen: Шему/Шема) — was a medieval Chechen state which, at the peak of it's power, stretched from the Terek River in the West to today's Dagestan in the East, while it's tributaries encomapassed almost all of todays Dagestan as well as Northern Azerbaijan, including the city Shemakha. It was established by Khour II after the Durdzuk reconquest of the plains in 1362, and the name of the state may have derived from the Chechen town Simsar (today called Simsir), which is not to be confused with the Dagestani village of the same name.
The state was eventually ravaged and almost destroyed during the main Timurid invasion between 1395 to 1396, before being revived by its last ruler, Surakat, under whom the Princedom continued its existence for more than 30 years.

Etymology
According to Murtazaliev, the word "Sim" is a Turkic distortion of the Chechen word "Shem", which has been used by the chroniclers of Timur. "The gates of Simsim" is mentioned in chronicles, which may have been the Darial Gorge, which Simsim possessed.

Durdzuk reconquest of the plains and Simsim's Establishment

Background
During the period known as the "Great troubles" in the Golden Horde, uprisings, civil wars and assassinations of Khans caused great instablity in the empire. According to folklore, this is where Khour's rebellion starts.

Prelude
After gathering the Mekhk-Khetasho (National assembly) in western Chechnya, completing the tasks given to him by the elders ("Syirs"), Khour II, also known as Gayur Khan or Kair Khan, was chosen the leader of the Vaynakh nation, afterwhich he gathered a nation wide militia, which was funded by the Kingdom of Georgia, who supplied the armies with horses and handworkers.

In folklore
According to popular Chechen folklore, after having gathered his army, Khour II descended down from the mountains and took control over the two economic centers of the North Caucasus: Chir-Yurt, followed by Khunzakh. Then, he advanced north and ambushed the warlord Mamai on the Terek River. This forced him to retreat to the fortress Tatar-Tup, which was then besieged by Khour's army. After a long siege, the Chechen army won, forcing Mamai to flee to the city Madzhar, which was then attacked and mostly destroyed by Khour's troops, afterwhich Mamai fled north. Khour hunted him and his army down, where they defeated several Nogai and Oirat garrisons not far from the Kuma River.

In history
A story about an army of "Lam Kersts" (Chechen: "Mountain Christians") was mentioned in a manuscpript by the Russian-Tatar general Sultan Kazi-Girey. It states that an army of "Lam Kersts" besieged the fortress Tatar-Tup and defeated Mamai, forcing him to flee. Then it states that the same army marched to the Kuma River and attacked Nogai and Oirat garrisons, doing "great damage to them". The manuscript also states that Khour's reconquest of the plane was between 1361-1362.

The legend of Khour II is also evidenced by archeological finds, as Golden Horde minted coins ceased to exist after the year 1362, but resurfaced in 1380, with the reign of Tokhtamysh, who was the ally of Khour II.

Aftermath
The successful reconquest of the plains as well as defeat of Mamai severely weakening the Golden Horde allowed the establishment of a new, independent Durdzuk state ― the Princedom of Simsim.
Further, (Nakh) rulers of fragments of the former Kingdom of Alania united several regions, thus forming kingdoms, as well as other nations. Those were:
Princedom of Simsim, today's Chechnya, Ingushetia, and parts of Dagestan, ruled and established by Khour II, its capital being the Simsar village.
Kingdom of Buriberd todays, Karachay-Cherkessia and Pjatigorye , ruled and established by Burak Khan, its capital being the Buriberd fortress.
Kingdom of Pulad, today's North Ossetia-Alania and parts of Ingushetia and Kabardino-Balkaria, ruled and established by Pul-Adi, its capital being the Pulad fortress.
Kingdom of Kuli and T'aus, today's Kabardino-Balkaria, ruled and established by Kuli and T'aus, its capital being the fortresses Kuli and T'aus
Avar Khanate, today's Southwestern region of Dagestan, ruled and established by Surakat, its capital being Khunzakh.
Note that in Zafarnama, the names of these kingdoms stem from the king that ruled over them, not the actual name of the state.

These states, exluding Simsim existed between 1362, with the end of Khour's reconquest of the plains, until 1395, with the Timurid invasions.

Society 
During the Middle Ages, Chechen societies such as Simsir had a hierarchical and pyramidal structure. The Prince of Simsim, the prince (Eela) sat at the top, followed by nobility and vassals (uzden), followed by free commoners (halxoi), after which came servants (yalxoi, including gharbashash, i.e. bond women), followed by serfs (lesh, lai in the singular), with only slaves and war captives (yiisarsh) beneath them; additionally, clerics were placed in the uzden nobility class. The wife of a prince was called a stuu and addressed as stulla.

Religion 
The official state religion of Simsim was Islam, which it had adopted to maintain allied relations with the Golden Horde (see below). However, Khour II continued his policy of religious tolerance. This is evidenced by the establishment of the "Catholic bishopric of the Caspian Mountains" in 1362, one year after the establishment of Simsim. By 1392, 5 Catholic centers were located on today's Chechnya and Dagestan: Komek, Tuma, Targu, Durgeli and Mikakha. The last might have been located in Nokhch-Mokhk, Eastern Chechnya, as this region was referred to as "Michikakh" by Kipchak Turks. The Zikh diocese (province) also operated across the North Caucasus, but was abolished in 1398.

Politics 
Simsim alied itself to the number of kingdoms established following his reconquest of the plains, such as the Kingdom of Buriberd or Pulad. Khour II also built relations with the mountainous communities of Dagestan, especially the Tsakhur Khanate, a Lezgin state.

Relations with the Golden Horde 
Khour II was very close to Khan Khidir, who at times used him as an ambassador to the Rus cities for negotiations and peace. After the death of Khan Khidir, the Golden Horde fell into chaos for over 20 years. He was also an important ally to Khan Tokhtamysh, which is seen from the 18th century manuscript by the general Sultan Kazi-Girey which notes that the Chechens were in the vanguard of the Tokhtamysh against the Timurid Empire during the Battle of the Terek river. The defeat of the Golden Horde led to disastrous consequences for the Simsim Princedom as Timur decided to invade due to their alliance with Tokhtamysh.

Timurid invasions 

Simsim along with other Caucasian nations actively participated in the Tokhtamysh-Timur war on the side of the Golden Horde. The war ended with the victory of Timur during the Battle of the Terek river, after which the Timurids invaded and devastated the North Caucasus, starting in the West, with the Circassians. Timur set up his headquarters not far North from todays Karachai-Cherkessia, after which he sent an army led by his son Muhammad Sultan to the region to conquer the region. Timur himself invaded the Kingdom of Buriberd, eventually besieging and capturing its capital, the Buriberd fortress, and after a short expedition into the mountains to punish and defeat the highlanders, the Timurids returned to their headquarters, where he prepared for the conquest of Kuli and T'aus and Pulad. After several fierce and brutal battles, Timur successfully defeated these kingdoms, capturing and destroying their capitals.

Following the conquest of Pulad, Timur returned to his headquarters, where he prepared for the conquest of Simsim. Having crossed the Sunzha River, Timur defeated the Simsim army during the Battle of Khankala gorge, after which Timur ravaged Nokhchiy-Are, central Chechnya. He then set up his new headquarters on Mt. Syura-Korta, from where he advanced into the mountains, destroying fortresses, temples and churces. During his advance into the mountains, the national council moved the capital to a geographical inaccessiable region, Malkhista, Souteastern Chechnya. His advance was eventually stopped after the Battle of K'hima, in which his army was unable to conquer the fortress. He then turned North, followed by his fierce but successful invasion of Nokhch-Mokhk, after which he left Simsim and expeditioned across mountainous Dagestan, where he killed the leader of the Avakhar, Ma'adiy and the ruler of the Gazikumukh Shamkhalate, Shovkhal. After his invasion of Avaria, during which he expelled the Surak family, founded by Khour's brother Surakat, he left the North Caucasus and pursued Tokhtamysh, leaving garrisons of his army behind.

Having heard of the death of his brother, Surakat, together with his son Bayr, his remaining army and a convoy filled with his wealth, travelled to Simsim and established their residence in the Kirda fortress, Souteastern Chechnya, thus making it the new capital. After having allied with George VII, the united forces of the Princedom of Simsim and the Kingdom of Georgia carried out several successful operations against the Timurid army stationed in the mountains of today's Chechnya between 1396 to 1398.

Later years 
In 1398, the Simsim and Kingdom of Georgia launched a joint invasion of Shirvanshah, which was ruled by the pro-Timurid Darbandy dynasty. In 1399, Timur, enraged by the invasion, travelled to Simsim, where he conducted a counter-offensive against the allies, pushing their forces beyond Hereti and Kakheti. In 1400, Timur tried invading Simsim, however, after being unable to penetrate the mountains, he travelled south, devastating the Kartli region.

In 1411, Simsim fought alongside with the Kingdom of Georgia during the Battle of Chalagan, fought between Kara-Koyonlu and the Kingdom of Georgia. The battle ended in a defeat for the allies, however.

In the early 1430s, one final offensive was carried out between the Princedom of Simim and the Kingdom of Georgia in Shirvanshah, which ended in a success for the allies, allowing the Surak dynasty to be re-established in the Avar Khanate as well as the severe weakening of the influence of the Darbandy dynasty in Shirvanshah.

Civil war 
Following the death of Surakat, a civil war for power that lasted decades followed. There were several participants in the conflict, with Pula "Vokhkal" regime (Pula "The Great") and Biych'cha, the son of the tax collector of Surakat being the most notable. Foreign powers also tried occupying Vaynakh lands: In 1454, the "Kassogs" (medieval term for the Circassians) invaded former Simsim lands and occupied the Northwestern plane. A counter-offensive conducted by a coalition of several Vaynakh feudal lords such as Pula, Akhmer (former Shamkhal of Tarki) and Yand reconquered the lands surrounding the Gekhi river, however, during another campaign, Yand died, after which the coalition was forced to retreat into the mountains The Circassians were eventually (mostly) driven out by Pula and Akhmer.
In the east, the Gazikumukh Shamkhalate established control over Nokhch-Mokhk, East Chechnya. The region would only be reconquered in 1548 under Zok' K'ant. All of these wars resulted in the collapse of Simsim. The war for succession only ended in the 2nd half of the 15th century, during which the Chechen people under Pula the Great established a new form of government, ruled by the "Vokhka Ela" (Grand Duke). Pula was elected the Vokhka Ela of the state that would be known as "Vilayat Chachan", "Chadzhan" or "Dzheyedzhev" in medieval sources.
Other attempts from regions to take over had failed, such as the feudal lords of Argun, whom Pula Vokhkal defeated.

See also 
Khour II
Surakat
Mongol invasions of Durdzuketi
Timurid invasions of Simsim
Chechen-Kazikumukh war
Tokhtamysh-Timur war
Battle of the Terek River

References 

History of Chechnya
History of Ingushetia
Principalities
Golden Horde
History of the North Caucasus
1362 establishments in Europe